Bronzewing Airport  is located at Bronzewing Gold Mine, Western Australia.

See also
 List of airports in Western Australia
 Aviation transport in Australia

References

External links
 Airservices Aerodromes & Procedure Charts

Airports in Western Australia
Mid West (Western Australia)